Bellator 271: Cyborg vs. Kavanagh was a mixed martial arts event produced by Bellator MMA that took place on November 12, 2021, at the Seminole Hard Rock Hotel & Casino Hollywood in Hollywood, Florida, United States.

Background 
The event was headlined by Cris Cyborg who faced off against Sinead Kavanagh for the Bellator Women's Featherweight World Championship. Cyborg completed her third successful title defense since coming over from the UFC in 2019. The 36-year-old captured the championship in her first promotional appearance when she stopped Julia Budd in the fourth round at Bellator 238 in January 2020. Since then, Cyborg has gone on to earn stoppage wins over Arlene Biencowe and Leslie Smith. Kavanagh got her first shot at Bellator gold in her ninth promotional appearance. The SBG Ireland featherweight entered the bout on back-to-back victories — a unanimous decision win over Katharina Lehner at Bellator Euro Series 9 in October, and a second-round TKO of Olga Rubin at Bellator 234.

A heavyweight bout between #6 ranked Steve Mowry and promotional newcomer Rakim Cleveland was also scheduled for this event.

A middleweight bout between Jordan Newman and Shane O'Shea was scheduled for the event, however O'Shea won't weigh-in due to undisclosed reasons and the bout was scrapped.

Results

See also 

 2021 in Bellator MMA
 List of Bellator MMA events
 List of current Bellator fighters
 Bellator MMA Rankings

References 

Bellator MMA events
2021 in mixed martial arts
November 2021 sports events in the United States
2021 in sports in Florida
Mixed martial arts in Florida
Sports competitions in Florida
Events in Hollywood, Florida